Spodnji Ivanjci is a village in the Ščavnica Valley in the Municipality of Gornja Radgona in northeastern Slovenia.

There is a small chapel-shrine with a belfry in the settlement. It was built in the early 20th century.

References

External links
Spodnji Ivanjci on Geopedia

Populated places in the Municipality of Gornja Radgona